This is a list of members of the South Australian House of Assembly from 1982 to 1985, as elected at the 1982 state election:

 The Liberal member for Bragg, David Tonkin, resigned on 10 April 1983. Liberal candidate Graham Ingerson won the resulting by-election on 14 May 1983.
 The Labor member for Elizabeth, Peter Duncan, resigned on 25 October 1984 in order to contest the federal seat of Makin at the 1984 election. Independent candidate Martyn Evans won the resulting by-election on 1 December 1984.
 The National Country Party changed its name to the National Party during the course of this term.

Members of South Australian parliaments by term
20th-century Australian politicians